Anthony Adrian Keith-Falconer, 5th Earl of Kintore, 5th Lord Keith of Inverurie and Keith Hall ( – 30 August 1804), who was known as the 7th Lord Falconer of Halkerton, between 1776 and 1778, was a Dutch-Scottish aristocrat.

Early life
He was born in Groningen, the Netherlands around 1742 and grew up in a house on Oosterstraat in Groningen. He was the eldest surviving son of William Falconer, 6th Lord Falconer of Halkerton, a colonel in the Dutch Army, and Rembertina Maria Idiking (the daughter of Burgomaster Idiking of Groningen). His paternal grandparents were David Falconer, 4th Lord Falconer of Halkerton and the former Lady Catherine Margaret Keith (the daughter of William Keith, 2nd Earl of Kintore).

Career
Upon the death of his father on 12 December 1776, he succeeded as 7th Lord Falconer of Halkerton. In 1761, on the death of William Keith, 4th Earl of Kintore, the earldom should have passed under the terms of the 1694 regrant to Lord Kintore's cousin George Keith, 10th and last Earl Marischal, as heir male of George Keith, 8th Earl Marischal (the elder brother of John Keith, 1st Earl of Kintore); however, he had been attainted for his part in the 1715 rising and so the earldom of Kintore remained suspended until the death of the 10th Earl Marischal on 28 May 1778, when it was inherited by Anthony, the heir general of the 4th Earl of Kintore, who changed his surname to Keith-Falconer and became the 5th Earl of Kintore. He inherited the estate of Kintore, Hallforest Castle which had been given to the family by King Robert the Bruce, and Keith Hall.

From 1794 to 1804, he served as Lord Lieutenant of Kincardineshire, the British monarch's personal representative in the lieutenancy area of the United Kingdom. After his death, he was succeeded by John Arbuthnott, 8th Viscount of Arbuthnott.

Personal life
Around 1766, he was married to Christina Elizabeth Sighterman (d. 1809), a daughter of Jan Albert Sighterman of Groningen, the Intendant General of the Dutch Settlements in the East Indies and Director and Fiscal of Bengal in 1734. Together, they were the parents of one son and seven daughters, none of whom married:

 William Keith-Falconer, 6th Earl of Kintore (1766–1812), who married Maria Bannerman, a daughter of Sir Alexander Bannerman, 6th Baronet and Mary Gordon (a daughter of Sir James Gordon) in 1793.
 Lady Sibella Keith-Falconer (1768–1792).
 Lady Maria Remembertina Keith-Falconer (1769–1851).
 Lady Catherine Margaret Keith-Falconer (1770–1849).
 Lady Francina Constantia Keith-Falconer (1771–1779).
 Hon. Jean Keith-Falconer (b. 1772), who died in infancy.
 Lady Christian Elizabeth Keith-Falconer (1774–1826).
 Hon. Helen Keith-Falconer (b. 1777), who died in infancy.

Lord Kintore died on 30 August 1804. His widow died nearly five years later on 26 March 1809.

References
Notes

Sources

External links
Keith-Falconer, Anthony Adrian (d1804) 5th Earl of Kintore at the National Archives
The papers of the earls of Kintore at Edinburgh University Press

|-

1742 births
1804 deaths
Earls of Kintore
People from Groningen (city)
Lord-Lieutenants of Kincardineshire